Sergey Konstantinovich Gulev (born November 29, 1958) is a Russian climate scientist. He is head of the ocean-atmosphere interaction laboratory at the Shirshov Institute of Oceanology, Russian Academy of Sciences and is a professor of oceanology and meteorology at Moscow State University. In 2011, he was elected as a Corresponding Member of the Russian Academy of Sciences.

He served as a lead author of the 2007 and 2014 IPCC Scientific Assessment Reports on Climate Change, and is currently (as of 2018) coordinating lead author in the forthcoming Sixth Assessment Report.

Awards 

He was a Humboldt Fellow 1992/1993 at the Institut für Meereskunde Kiel, now called GEOMAR Helmholtz Centre for Ocean Research Kiel.

References 

1958 births
Russian climatologists
Russian meteorologists
Russian physicists
Living people
Moscow State University alumni
Intergovernmental Panel on Climate Change contributing authors
Intergovernmental Panel on Climate Change lead authors
Corresponding Members of the Russian Academy of Sciences